is an underground Interchange metro station located in Mizuho-ku, Nagoya, Aichi Prefecture, Japan operated by the Nagoya Municipal Subway. Meijō Line. It is located 20.7 kilometers from the terminus of the Meijō Line at Kanayama Station and 11.8 kilometers from the terminus of the Sakura-dōri Line at Nakamura Kuyakusho Station.

History
Aratama-bashi Station was opened on 30 March 1974 as the terminal station for the Nagoya Municipal Subway Line No.4, which was later renamed the Meijō Line. The Sakura-dōri Line connected to the station on 30 March 1994. The Meijō Line was extended to Nagoya Daigaku Station on 6 October 2004.

Lines

 (Station number: M23)
 (Station number: S14)

Layout
Aratama-bashi Station has two underground island platforms.

Platforms

References

External links
 Aratama-bashi Station official web site 

Railway stations in Japan opened in 1974
Railway stations in Aichi Prefecture